Hadley & Anor v Baxendale & Ors [1854] EWHC J70 is a leading English contract law case. It sets the leading rule to determine consequential damages from a breach of contract: a breaching party is liable for all losses that the contracting parties should have foreseen. However, if the other party has special knowledge that the party-in-breach does not, the breaching party is only liable for the losses that he could have foreseen on the information available to him.

Facts
The claimants, Mr Hadley and another, were millers and mealmen and worked together in a partnership. A crankshaft of a steam engine at the mill had broken and Hadley arranged to have a new one made by W. Joyce & Co. in Greenwich. Before the new crankshaft could be made, W. Joyce & Co. required that the broken crankshaft be sent to them in order to ensure that the new crankshaft would fit together properly with the other parts of the steam engine. Hadley contracted with defendants Baxendale and Ors to deliver the crankshaft to engineers for repair by a certain date at a cost of £2 sterling and 4 shillings.

Baxendale failed to deliver on the date in question, causing Hadley to lose business. Hadley sued for the profits he lost due to Baxendale's late delivery, and the jury awarded Hadley damages of £50. Baxendale appealed, contending that he did not know that Hadley would suffer any particular damage by reason of the late delivery.

The question raised by the appeal in this case was whether a defendant in a breach of contract case could be held liable for damages that the defendant was not aware would be incurred from a breach of the contract.

Judgment

The Court of Exchequer, led by Baron Sir Edward Hall Alderson, declined to allow Hadley to recover lost profits, holding that Baxendale could be held liable only for losses that were generally foreseeable, or if Hadley had mentioned his special circumstances in advance. The mere fact that a party is sending something to be repaired does not indicate that the party would lose profits if it is not delivered on time. The court suggested various other circumstances under which Hadley could have entered into this contract that would not have presented such dire circumstances, and noted that where special circumstances exist, provisions can be made in the contract voluntarily entered into by the parties to impose extra damages for a breach. Alderson B said the following:

Significance
Lon L. Fuller and WR Perdue evaluated the idea of reducing contractual remoteness to foreseeability in this way:

As early as 1894, the U.S. Supreme Court recognized the influence of Hadley upon American law:

The Hadley holding was later incorporated into Section 351 of the Restatement (Second) of Contracts.  A 1994 law review article noted that as of that year, Hadley had been cited with approval by the state supreme courts of 43 U.S. states; three state supreme courts had adopted the Hadley holding without citing Hadley itself; and intermediate appellate courts in the four other states had also favorably cited Hadley.

In Satef-Huttenes Albertus SpA v Paloma Tercera Shipping Co SA (The Pegase) [1981] 1 Lloyd’s Rep 175, Robert Goff J stated,

However, it has been suggested that the rule in Hadley v Baxendale is not as novel as its celebrated importance suggests. James Edelman, a Justice of the High Court of Australia gave a speech on the topic, asserting that "the rule set out in Hadley v Baxendale was not novel". For example, Edelman noted that, in 1564, the French jurist Charles Dumoulin had argued that liability for breach of contract should be limited to foreseeable damage, thereby pre-dating this same sentiment in Hadley v Baxendale.

The core of the judgment below is often cited as an example of a combination of the objective test and a subjective test:

See also
Victoria Laundry (Windsor) Ltd v Newman Industries Ltd [1948] 2 KB 528
Koufos v Czarnikow Ltd or The Heron II [1969] 1 AC 350
Parsons (Livestock) Ltd v Uttley Ingham & Co Ltd [1978] 1 QB 791
South Australia Asset Management Co v York Montague [1996] 3 All ER 365
Jackson v Royal Bank of Scotland [2005] 2 All ER 71
The Achilleas [2008] UKHL 48

Notes

External links
Judgment of Alderson B  pdf file hosted by mtsu.edu
Judgment available via Bailii (abridged)
English Reports version available via Google Books
Historical background of case
Picture of Hadley's mill

1854 in case law
English remedy case law
1854 in British law
Court of Exchequer Chamber cases